The following is a list of MTV Pilipinas winners for Favorite Female Video.

Reference

MTV Pilipinas Music Awards